Massimo Orlando (born 26 May 1971) is an Italian professional football coach and a former player, who played as a midfielder. He manages the youth team of ACF Fiorentina.

Club career
Orlando was born in San Donà di Piave. After beginning his club career with Conegliano Calcio (1986–1988), he played for seven seasons (122 games, 16 goals) in the Serie A, for ACF Fiorentina (1990–97), A.C. Milan (1994–95) and Atalanta B.C. (1997–99); he played for Juventus in 1990 without making an appearance in Serie A for the club during the 1990–91 season. He also played for Reggina (1988–90), and retired in 2001, after a spell with Pistoiese.

International career
At international level, Orlando was a member of the Italy U21 national team that won the UEFA European Under-21 Football Championship under manager Cesare Maldini in 1992.

Style of play
Regarded as a promising player in his youth, Orlando was a creative and technically gifted attacking midfielder, with an excellent left foot and good dribbling skills. Although he was usually deployed in the centre, he was also capable of playing on the left. A team-player, although he was not a prolific goalscorer, he was known for his generous and unselfish playing style in midfield. Despite his talent, he struggled to live up to his potential and his career was also affected by several injuries.

Honours
Fiorentina
 Coppa Italia: 1995–96
 Supercoppa Italiana: 1996 (on the roster, but not played in the game)

Milan
 Supercoppa Italiana: 1994 (both times on the roster, but not played in the game)
 UEFA Super Cup: 1994 (on the roster, but not played in the game)

Italy U21
 UEFA European Under-21 Football Championship: 1992

References

External links
 

1971 births
Living people
Italian footballers
Association football midfielders
Italy under-21 international footballers
Serie A players
Serie B players
Reggina 1914 players
Juventus F.C. players
ACF Fiorentina players
A.C. Milan players
Atalanta B.C. players
U.S. Pistoiese 1921 players
Italian football managers
Competitors at the 1993 Mediterranean Games
Mediterranean Games competitors for Italy